Naina Dhaliwal (born 16 September 1984) is an Indian model and actress who has appeared in Bollywood films. Dhaliwal won the Gladrags Mrs. India contest in 2004 and represented India at the Miss Globe 2005 contest in Palm Springs, California.

Born and brought up in Ludhiana, Punjab, Dhaliwal completed her basic education from Christian Convent School, Kapurthala and graduated with a degree in Humanities from Ramgarhia College.

Filmography 
Madhoshi (2004)
Anthony Kaun Hai? (2006)
www.Love.com (2010)
Cabaret (2011)
Amavas (2011)
Dand — The Punishment (2011)
Jackpot — The Money Game(2012)

References

External links 
 

1984 births
21st-century Indian actresses
Actresses from Punjab, India
Actresses in Hindi cinema
Female models from Punjab, India
Indian film actresses
Indian Sikhs
Living people